The University Centre Hastings was a small higher education institute located in Hastings, England that was managed by University of Brighton. The centre was opened in 2003 in buildings previously occupied by BT.

The University Centre today
The name University Centre Hastings is no longer in existence. By 2009, the University of Brighton was offering 95% of the courses at University Centre Hastings as other partners withdrew. At this stage, the university took on University Centre Hastings as its fifth campus and its name was changed to University of Brighton in Hastings (it has four other campuses across East Sussex, in Brighton and Eastbourne). The University of Brighton in Hastings now offers undergraduate degrees in more than 30 subjects including: Applied Social Science, Human and Environmental Biology, Broadcast Journalism, Broadcast Media, Computing, Community History, Education, English Literature, Mathematics, Media Studies, Nursing/Midwifery and Sociology. A second university building in Priory Square, designed by Proctor and Matthews Architects, opened in 2012 and the university campus now caters for almost 1,000 students.

See also
 University of Brighton
 University Centre Peterborough

References

External links
Official site.

Buildings and structures in Hastings
Educational institutions established in 2003
University of Sussex
University of Brighton
Open University
Canterbury Christ Church University
Defunct universities and colleges in England
2003 establishments in England